Langford railway station served the village of Lower Langford, North Somerset, England, from 1901 to 1931 on the Wrington Vale Light Railway.

History 
The station was opened on 4 December 1901 by the Great Western Railway. It closed on 14 September 1931.

References 

Former Great Western Railway stations
Railway stations in Great Britain opened in 1901
Railway stations in Great Britain closed in 1931
1901 establishments in England
1931 disestablishments in England